Suhaimi bin Nasir (born 9 October 1969) is a Malaysian politician who is serving as the Nominated Member of Sabah State Legislative Assembly (MLA) since October 2020. He is a member of the United Malays National Organisation (UMNO) which is a part of the Pakatan Harapan-led unity government since 2022 (formerly aligned with the Perikatan Nasional coalition prior to 2022).

Election results

Honours 
 :
  Commander of the Order of Kinabalu (PGDK) – Datuk  (2021)

References

Members of the Sabah State Legislative Assembly
United Malays National Organisation politicians
Living people
1969 births